Giovanni Ricchiuti is an Italian archbishop of the Catholic church. On 15 October, he's been appointed as archbishop of the diocese of Altamura-Gravina-Acquaviva delle Fonti.

Life 
Giovanni Ricchiuti was born on 1 August 1948 in Bisceglie, in the Province of Barletta-Andria-Trani. He studied at the middle school of the seminary of Bisceglie and he attended the high school and seminaries in Molfetta. On 9 September 1972, he was ordained as presbyter by archbishop Giuseppe Carata. After the ordainment, he continued to study inside the Pontificio Istituto Biblico, Rome.

From 1975 to 1976, he was vice-rector of the Minor Seminary  and then he was appointed parochial vicar of the parrocchia della Misericordia, in Bisceglie, where he stayed until 1979; in 1980, he was appointed parish priest, while in February 1994, he left the parish after being appointed rector of the seminary Pontificio Seminario Regionale Pugliese Pio XI, located in Molfetta.

On 27 July 2005, Pope Benedict XVI appointed him as archbishop of Acerenza; he succeeded Michele Scandiffio, who had resigned due to his age. On 8 October, he received episcopal ordination in Basilica di San Giuseppe (Bisceglie), by the archbishop Francesco Monterisi (then cardinal). On 15 October, he took possession of the archdiocese of Acerenza.

On 15 October 2013, Pope Francis nominated him bishop, with the title ad personam of archbishop of the diocese of Altamura-Gravina-Acquaviva delle Fonti; he succeeded Mario Paciello. On 4 January 2014, he took possession of the diocese.

On 23 April 2017, he inaugurated the diocesan family counseling, with the purpose of supporting families and their educational role. He is currently also a member of the Episcopal Commission for Social Problems and Work, Justice and Peace of the Episcopal Conference of Italy.

Episcopal ministry
In October 2020, Mgr Ricchiuti declared legalization of gay adoptions could be a good way to avoid the bearing surogacy. He was one of the first Italian bishops to publicly express a similar position.

He is also actively engaged in the anti-nuclearism and has expressed the Pax Christi's dislike with concerns to the Lockheed Martin F-35 Lightning II procurement.

Positions held 
 Archbishop-bishop of the diocese of Altamura-Gravina-Acquaviva delle Fonti
 Chairman of Pax Christi Italia
 Governor of the General Hospital Francesco Miulli, in Acquaviva delle Fonti, Bari (Italy)
 Chairman of the Commissione episcopale per la Famiglia e la Vita e per la Pastorale giovanile della Conferenza episcopale pugliese

Positions held in the past 
 Rector of the seminary Pontificio seminario regionale pugliese Pio XI
 Archbishop of Acerenza

Episcopal genealogy 
 Cardinal Scipione Rebiba
 Cardinal Giulio Antonio Santori
 Cardinal Girolamo Bernerio, O.P.
 Archbishop Galeazzo Sanvitale
 Cardinal Ludovico Ludovisi
 Cardinal Luigi Caetani
 Cardinal Ulderico Carpegna
 Cardinal Paluzzo Paluzzi Altieri degli Albertoni
 Pope Benedict XIII
 Pope Benedict XIV
 Pope Clement XIII
 Cardinal Henry Benedict Stuart
 Pope Leo XII
 Cardinal Chiarissimo Falconieri Mellini
 Cardinal Camillo Di Pietro
 Cardinal Mieczysław Halka Ledóchowski
 Cardinal Jan Puzyna de Kosielsko
 Archbishop Józef Bilczewski
 Archbishop Bolesław Twardowski
 Archbishop Eugeniusz Baziak
 Pope John Paul II
 Cardinal Francesco Monterisi
 Archbishop Giovanni Ricchiuti

Heraldry

See also 
 Diocese of Altamura-Gravina-Acquaviva delle Fonti
 Archdiocese of Acerenza
 Altamura Diocesan Museum Matroneum

References 

1948 births
21st-century Italian Roman Catholic archbishops
People from Bari
Living people